Stealth is a launched roller coaster in the Amity area of Thorpe Park located in Surrey, England. Built and designed by Intamin of Switzerland for £12 million, the Accelerator Coaster model opened in 2006, a year after another Accelerator, Rita, opened at sister park Alton Towers. It is the fastest roller coaster in the UK, and the second tallest after the Big One at Blackpool Pleasure Beach.

Ride experience 
When the passengers board the ride, an engine revving noise is played in the station loop as a recording announces “Place your heads back, face forwards, hold on tight and brace yourself!” Followed by the sound of tires screeching.
After passengers are securely restrained, the launch sequence begins when the brake fins are retracted as the train attaches to the catch car. Sometimes smoke is produced from below the cars, presumably to simulate wheelspin. Overhead, a series of five red lights illuminate one by one in a horizontal row as the announcer in the recording once again announces, "Place your heads back, face forwards…" Shortly after, a second row of green lights begin to illuminate as the announcer in the recording enthusiastically shouts "Three, two, one! Go, go, go!" The train then turns 90 degrees to the left as it crests the top hat. It makes another 90-degree left turn as it descends down the other side of the element. After bottoming out, the train enters an airtime hill, which produces a brief sensation of weightlessness before the train enters the magnetic brake run and returns to the station.

Rollbacks 
As with many Intamin Launch Coasters, Stealth experiences occasional rollbacks, which occur when a train is unable to complete the course, specifically failing to make it over the top hat element as a result of energy loss. Occurrences are rare, and there is a braking system in place on the launch side of the track to safely bring the roller coaster back to a complete stop. However rollbacks are safe, and all staff/engineers are trained to safely evacuate guests off the train. Many enthusiasts see experiencing a rollback as an achievement.

The signage outside the ride states that Stealth accelerates from 0 to 80mph in 2.3 seconds, instead of stating its current acceleration rate (of going from 0 to 80mph in 1.9 seconds). This is because, when the ride was first opened, it accelerated at this slower rate:  the acceleration was made faster a few years after the ride was first opened, but the signage was not updated to reflect this change.

References

External links

Stealth at Thorpe Park

Roller coasters operated by Merlin Entertainments
Roller coasters in the United Kingdom
Roller coasters introduced in 2006
Thorpe Park roller coasters